The Hard Man is a 1957 American Western film directed by George Sherman and starring Guy Madison.

Plot
A Texas Ranger (Guy Madison) turns deputy sheriff; a woman (Valerie French) wants him to kill her cattle-baron husband (Lorne Greene).

Cast
 Guy Madison as Steve Burden 
 Valerie French as Fern Martin  
 Lorne Greene as Rice Martin
 Myron Healey as Ray Hendry  
 Barry Atwater as George Dennison  
 Robert Burton as Sheriff Hacker 
 Rudy Bond as John Rodman  
 Trevor Bardette as Mitch Willis  
 Renata Vanni as Juanita

See also
 List of American films of 1957

References

External links
 

1957 films
1957 Western (genre) films
American Western (genre) films
Films directed by George Sherman
Columbia Pictures films
1950s English-language films
1950s American films